"Big Big World" is a song by Swedish singer Emilia. It was released on 17 September 1998 as the lead single from the album of the same name and was written by Emilia and Lasse Anderson. The song is about love, with references to the autumn season. The melody opening is based on the Swedish springtime song "Nu grönskar det", which in turn is based on the Peasant Cantata by Johann Sebastian Bach.

"Big Big World" was a hit in Europe, where it reached number-one in eight countries and peaked within the top five in several others, but it fared less well in the United States, where it remained at the bottom of the Billboard Hot 100, though it did reach the top 40 on two other Billboard charts. The song was given a Grammis award for "Song of the Year" in 1998 and also won a Rockbjörnen award as "Swedish Song of the Year" in 1998. On 20 September 2017, the song was the topic at SVT:s Hitlåtens historia.

Critical reception
AllMusic editor Roxanne Blanford wrote that the song is "gentle", arranged as a "pseudo-procession tune", "as if Emilia is taking her first cautious steps toward independence and adulthood." Chuck Taylor from Billboard said that its "magic touch" is "manifested via sheer straightforward simplicity-in performance, production, and message." He noted Emilia's "delicate voice, ripe with vulnerability and hurt, tells of being a big girl in a big world who shouldn't see it as a big deal if her partner leaves her ... but she will miss him much." He also added that "allusions to rain and autumn leaves help set up a perfect visual of stark sadness and loneliness, giving the song a strong seasonal punch." A reviewer from Birmingham Evening Mail stated that "this is another one of those Love It or Hate It records", adding that "it's incessant beat and simple rhythm will either drive you mad or drive you to put it on the CD player again...and again."

Daily Record called the song "chirpy". Swedish newspaper Expressen wrote that "Big Big World" is the "big, obvious hit this fall." Göteborgsposten commented that with this song, Emilia "has a big, big hit". Chuck Campbell from Knoxville News Sentinel said that the 20-year-old vocalist "assumes a sweetly fragile persona on the song, setting the mood with a sparse verse and chorus before the track folds in a shuffling beat and an orchestral arrangement." Nina Cassidy from Stanford Daily noted that it "has a catchy beat, and the lyrics and music have a smooth flow." Sunday Tribune called it a "sweet song", while Sunday World described it as a "cracking single". Kerry Gold from The Vancouver Sun deemed it "a song of such easy listening it could double as a nursery rhyme."

Chart performance
"Big Big World" was successful in Europe, reaching the number-one position in 8 countries; Austria, Belgium (Flanders), Germany, the Netherlands, Norway, Spain, Sweden and Switzerland. In Sweden, the song set a record for the fastest-played single on Swedish radio, receiving airplay at least once every 13 minutes. It also topped the Eurochart Hot 100 on 27 February 1999. The single reached number two in Belgium (Wallonia), Denmark, France, Hungary and Italy. It was also a top-10 hit in Finland, Greece, Ireland, and the United Kingdom. Outside Europe, "Big Big World" peaked at number three in New Zealand, number 17 in Australia, number 39 in Canada, and number 92 on the US Billboard Hot 100. It was awarded with a gold record in France (250,000), New Zealand (5,000) and Switzerland (25,000), silver record in the United Kingdom (200,000), and platinum record in Austria (50,000), Belgium (100,000 (2× Platinum)), Germany (500,000), the Netherlands (75,000), Norway (2× Platinum) and Sweden (90,000 (3× Platinum)).

Music video
The music video for "Big Big World" was recorded in New York City and is shot in black-and-white. It features Emilia wandering around in the city, performing the song at different places. Some scenes show the singer in the crowd of walking people on the street, other scenes shows her sitting on the edge at the top of a 12-storey high house. She is also seen standing in front of a window with a view.

Track listings

European CD single
 "Big Big World" – 3:22
 "Big Big World" (Traffic Jam mix—88 BPM) – 4:14

UK CD single
 "Big Big World" (radio edit) – 3:22
 "Big Big World" (album version) – 3:22
 "Big Big World" (Pierre J's big radio remix) – 3:29
 "Big Big World" (TNT big big club mix) – 6:31

UK cassette single
 "Big Big World" (radio edit) – 3:22
 "Big Big World" (Pierre J's big radio remix) – 3:29

Australian maxi-CD single
 "Big Big World" (album version) – 3:22
 "Big Big World" (Pierre J's big radio remix) – 3:30
 "Big Big World" (TNT's big phat radio edit) – 3:12
 "Big Big World" (karaoke version) – 3:22

Charts

Weekly charts

Year-end charts

Decade-end charts

Certifications

Release history

Cover versions and samples
Vietnamese-American singer Trish Thuy Trang, made a cover version of "Big Big World" for her 1999 album I'll Dream of You. German techno group Scooter sampled "Big Big World" on their single "And No Matches", taken from the 2007 album Jumping All Over the World.

References

1998 songs
1998 debut singles
1990s ballads
Black-and-white music videos
Dutch Top 40 number-one singles
Emilia Rydberg songs
European Hot 100 Singles number-one singles
Number-one singles in Austria
Number-one singles in Germany
Number-one singles in Norway
Number-one singles in Spain
Number-one singles in Sweden
Number-one singles in Switzerland
Pop ballads
Songs written by Emilia Rydberg
Songs written by Lasse Anderson
Ultratop 50 Singles (Flanders) number-one singles
Universal Music Group singles
Universal Records singles